Āraiši lake dwelling site is a popular tourist location with original and reconstructed remnants of Latvian prehistory. It is a unique nationally important archaeological site: remains of the 9th–10th centuries Latgalian fortified settlement on the island of Āraiši lake.

Features 
Today the lake dwelling is partially reconstructed and visitors can see rebuilt prehistoric Latgalian wooden buildings. During the excavations remains of 151 wooden buildings were discovered, with 3700 artifacts, and about a hundred thousand fragments of pottery were found.

Using collected data, ethnographic parallels and replicas of ancient tools, today there are 14 reconstructed buildings of the first period of the construction of the fortified settlement.

Āraiši archaeological museum park is a member of EXARC organization of open-air archaeological museums throughout Europe.

See also 
 Latgalians

References

External links
 
 http://www.ltg.lv/araisu.ezerpils 
 Āraišu ezerpils brīvdabas arheoloģiskais muzejs 
 The Association of Castles and Museums around the Baltic Sea

Archaeological sites in Latvia
Former populated places in Latvia
Cēsis Municipality
Vidzeme